Atractogloeaceae is a fungal family in the order Atractiellales. The family contains the single genus Atractogloea, which in turn contains the single species Atractogloea stillata, found in the USA.

See also
 List of Basidiomycota families

References

External links
 

Atractiellales
Fungi of North America
Fungi described in 1982
Monotypic Basidiomycota genera
Taxa named by Franz Oberwinkler